Limbang may refer to:

Limbang, city in Malaysia
Limbang (federal constituency), represented in the Dewan Rakyat
Limbang (state constituency), formerly represented in the Sarawak State Legislative Assembly (1969–2006)